William Samuel Segerdahl, (born 10 June 2002) is a Swedish singer. He participated in Idol 2018 which was broadcast on TV4. He placed in shared third place with Bragi Bergsson in the series semifinal on 30 November 2018. In 2017, Segerdahl released the songs "U-Turn" and "Trying". Since his participation in Idol, Segerdahl has released a handful of singles: "Problem", "Dansgolv", "Tåg", and "Ingenting Jag Säger Hjälper Nu", all of which were released during 2019. "Problem" reached number 3 on the Swedish Heatseeker Chart. In 2020, he has as of 29 April, released the singles "Det Kanske Inte är Så Farligt?" and "Aldrig".

Discography

Singles 
Adapted from Spotify.

Notes

References 

Living people
2002 births
Idol (Swedish TV series) participants
21st-century Swedish singers
21st-century Swedish male singers